A sacred text of Jeungism, the original Dojeon was published in Korean on October 25, 1992. The Dojeon has been translated into eight languages, including Korean, English, Japanese, German, Spanish, French, Russian and Chinese.

Background
Over one hundred years ago, Sangjenim (God the Father) was the first in all of Eastern and Western history to proclaim and fully describe the Later Heaven Gaebyeok. The precept of Gaebyeok applies to heaven and earth and to the realms of humanity and spirits, and it answers the mysteries of nature, explains the secrets of civilization, and resolves the limitations of Eastern and Western religions and philosophies.

After Sangjenim's ascension to heaven, the truth of gaebyeok was widely disseminated by the successor of His Dao lineage and authority, Taemonim (God the Mother).

The original Dojeon was published in Korean on October 25, 1992, for the 122nd commemoration of Sangjenim's birth, and it entailed twenty years of extensive research and fieldwork by Jeung San Do practitioners as they compiled the written and oral testimonies of Sangjenim's and Taemonim's disciples, the disciples’ descendants, and the disciples’ students.

The publication of the 2003 revised edition took an additional eleven years of effort involving further research and extensive review of old and new testimonials to verify and discover dates, sites, events, and people related to Sangjenim's and Taemonim's works of renewing heaven and earth.

The foreign-language translations of the Dojeon are based mostly on the 1992 Korean edition. Thus, the Dojeon represents thirty years of dedication by many people; it is the culmination of Jeung San Do's culture.

Content
Arranged in eleven chapters, the Dojeon spans Sangjenim's and Taemonim's lives, their work, their disciples, the principle upon which the universe evolves, the ultimate destiny of humanity, the existence of spirits, meditation, the times we live in, the coming civilization, and much more. Through the Dojeon, the reader can begin the process of understanding Jeung San Do's Eight Teachings:
 Sangjenim (The supreme God)
 Cosmology (the way of universe, Cosmic year) 
 Humanity 
 Spirits and Meditation (Tae Eul Ju meditation)
 The work of renewing heaven and earth (Human history) 天地公事
 Autumn Gaebyeok and Salvation 
 The Subu (Tao Lineage and Authority)
 The Ilggun (Workers) of work under heaven
 
The Dojeon records the true path that will allow the people of the world to survive the Later Heaven Gaebyeok and enter the new civilization of immortality. This makes the Dojeon history's greatest gift-a sacred text of life, not filled with words of despair and tears, but with a radiant and vivid vision of joy and hope for a future that transcends the limitations of modern civilization. But to appreciate the Dojeon's sacred truth, one must first understand Sangjenim and Taemonim.

See also
 Boeun (Offering Gratitude and Repayment) 報恩
 Cosmic Year
 Shao Yung
 Dojang Dao center 道場
 Gaebyeok 
 Haewon (Resolution of Bitterness and Grief) 解怨
 Jeung San Do
 Sangjenim 上帝
 Sangsaeng (Mutual life-giving) 相生
 Tae Eul Ju mantra 太乙呪
 Taemonim 太母
 Wonsibanbon (Returning to the Origin) 原始反本

External links
 Dojeon Online (Korean original)
 Dojeon Online (English translation)

Jeung San Do
Religious texts